Scandinavian Airlines Connect Ltd, also known as SAS Connect, and previously known as SAS Ireland or SAIL, is an Irish subsidiary of Scandinavian Airlines (SAS), and by extension SAS Group. The airline exclusively operates flights on behalf of SAS with a fleet of Airbus A320neo aircraft.

History
SAS set up its Ireland-based subsidiary in early 2017 and expected it to be operational by 1 November 2017. Initially, the airline was expected to be equipped with nine brand new Airbus A320neo; five aircraft to commence flights out of London Heathrow, and later from Málaga in spring 2018, with the remaining four aircraft on behalf of its parent company. 

SAS' intention was to replace its own aircraft with cheaper ones crewed and based outside Scandinavia to compete better with other airlines. The airline did not intend to employ its own staff, which was instead carried out by CAE, an aviation recruitment firm. CAE subsequently began the employment of the back end personnel in 2017.

The Swedish Pilots Union expressed its dissatisfaction with the operational structure of the new airline, suggesting it violates the current labour-agreements. The union also lamented the lack of coverage in Scandinavian media. The Swedish Cabin Crew Union also condemned the new venture and stated that SAS established the airline to "not pay decent salaries" to cabin crew. Jonas Sjöstedt, the former leader of the Swedish Left Party told a newspaper that the government of Sweden would have to stop the establishment of the new airline, but the Swedish minister for enterprise, Mikael Damberg told the same paper that "it is not an issue for the owner if the company decides to open bases abroad".

Citing delivery delays, SAS Ireland had to delay its launch until December 2017. The first revenue flight took place on 20 December 2017 from Copenhagen to London Heathrow.

In the summer of 2018, many flights intended to be operated by SAS Ireland were either cancelled or operated by the parent. At the same time, 26 pilots at SAS Ireland sent a letter to the corporate governance at SAS Group criticizing working conditions and safety levels. The chief instructor at SAS Ireland resigned after being criticized for having safety standards which were too high. During the brief period that the airline had been operating, they experienced the leave of a number of pilots with most of the ones that were still employed were actively looking for new employment.

In April 2020, SAS Ireland announced the closure of its Málaga base. In May 2021, it was announced that SAS Ireland would set up a base in Copenhagen, initially operating a fleet of 3-5 A320neo aircraft. SAS and the Danish union FPU (a part of the Danish Confederation of Trade Unions or FH) have signed a new collective bargaining agreement for pilots and cabin crew. In September 2021, SAS announced that SAS Ireland would be renamed SAS Connect, and later reported that operations based in Copenhagen would launch in early 2022.

Destinations

Fleet

The SAS Connect fleet consists of the following aircraft :

References

External links

Scandinavian Airlines
Airlines of the Republic of Ireland
Airlines established in 2017
SAS Group members
Star Alliance affiliate members
Irish companies established in 2017
Companies based in Dublin (city)